Orsoya Rocks (‘Skali Orsoya’ \ska-'li or-'so-ya\) is the group of rocks off the north coast of Robert Island in the South Shetland Islands, Antarctica, situated west-northwest of Mellona Rocks, north-northeast of Milev Rocks and east-northeast of Opaka Rocks, and extending 650 m in northwest-southeast direction and 500 m in northeast-southwest direction.

The rocks are named after the settlement of Orsoya in Northwestern Bulgaria.

Location
British mapping in 1968 and Bulgarian in 2009.

See also
 List of Antarctic and sub-Antarctic islands
 South Shetland Islands

Maps
 South Shetland Islands.  Scale 1:200000 topographic map.  DOS 610 Series, Sheet W 62 58.  Directorate of Overseas Surveys, Directorate of Overseas Surveys, Tolworth, UK, 1968.
Antarctic Digital Database (ADD). Scale 1:250000 topographic map of Antarctica. Scientific Committee on Antarctic Research (SCAR). Since 1993, regularly upgraded and updated.

References
 Bulgarian Antarctic Gazetteer. Antarctic Place-names Commission. (details in Bulgarian, basic data in English)
 Orsoya Rocks. SCAR Composite Gazetteer of Antarctica

External links
 Orsoya Rocks. Copernix satellite image

Rock formations of Robert Island
Bulgaria and the Antarctic